Veer Savarkar is a 2001 Indian Hindi-language biopic film based on the life of Vinayak Damodar Savarkar. This version was released on DVD format. This film is produced by Savarkar Darshan Prathisthan, under the president-ship of Sudhir Phadke. It was premiered on 16 November 2001, in Mumbai,  New Delhi, Nagpur and six other Indian cities. Rediff.com reports a claim that it is the first movie in the world financed by public donations. On 28 May 2012 its Gujarati language version was released by then Chief Minister of Gujarat, Narendra Modi.

The film was screened retrospective on August 13, 2016 at the Independence Day Film Festival jointly presented by the Indian Directorate of Film Festivals and Ministry of Defense, commemorating 70th Indian Independence Day. Produced by Sudhir Phadke who also composed music for this, it has been directed by Ved Rahi. Prabhakar Mone has been its chief production controller.

Cast
Shailendra Gaur as Vinayak Damodar Savarkar
Surendra Rajan as Mohandas Karamchand Gandhi
Navni Parihar as Mai Savarkar
Sushmeena Parihar as Savarkar's son 
Mrinal Kulkarni
Pankaj Berry as Madan Lal Dhingra
Ram Awana
Rohitash Gaud as Ganesh Damodar Savarkar
Arun Shekhar
Tom Alter
Bob Christo
Sunil Shende
Arun Bakshi
Supriya Karni
Madhusudan Tamhane

Production
This film was produced by Savarkar Darshan Prathisthan under the president-ship of Sudhir Phadke.
The film is reportedly the first movie in the world financed by public donations. In an interview Ved Rahi the informed that the first contribution was made by Lata Mukadam, who "spontaneously" donated her gold bangles. A Times of India story dated 18 September 2001 quotes Prabhakar Mone; "more than 10000 people contributed from Rs. Five to Rs. Fifty lakh. Four years back, our present prime minister Atal Bihari Vajpayee himself helped in raising Rs. 30 lakh for the movie by giving a lecture in the US... Prominent singers like Asha Bhosle, Pt. Bhimsen Joshi and Anup Jalota also aided in fund-raising."

The muhurat shot of the film was taken in 1990, changes to the team resulted in a delayed completion, by 15 September 1998, a fresh muhurat shot taken under director Ram Gabale who was the eighth's person chosen for the job, and script-writer D. M. Mirasdar who was the tenth script writer engaged. The other directors involved were Rajdatta, Basu Bhattacharya, Hrishikesh Mukherjee, Dr. Chandraprakash Dwivedi, Ved Rahi, Pradeep Dikshit and Prabhakar Pendharkar. Script-writers earlier working on the project were G. R. Kamat, Ved Rahi, Dr. Chandraprakash Dwivedi, Vasant Deo and Shrinivas Joshi.

Release
It premiered on 16 November 2001, in Mumbai, New Delhi, Nagpur and six other Indian cities. On 28 May 2012 its Gujarati language version was released by the chief minister of Gujarat, Narendra Modi. This version was released on DVD format.

Reception
Anjum N reviewing the film for Rediff.com notes that though the film took a long time to produce this time lag is not evident. He also mentions the film publicity brochures that declare the film as "financed 'by the people'".

The film had a silver jubilee run at Plaza cinema, Mumbai and Pune's Prabhat cinema.

The Government of Goa, gave the film a "tax-free status"

See also
 List of Asian historical drama films
 List of artistic depictions of Mahatma Gandhi

References

External links 

 

Indian biographical films
Films set in the Indian independence movement
Memorials to Vinayak Damodar Savarkar
Cultural depictions of Mahatma Gandhi